Etymology is the study of the history of words.

Etymology or etymologies may also refer to: 
 Etymologiae, a 7th century encyclopedia compiled by Isidore of Seville
 The Etymologies (Tolkien), an 1987 Elvish dictionary by J. R. R. Tolkien
 Etymology (album), a 1997 audio library by Skeleton Crew

See also